Capitol Music Group Sweden is a Swedish music company which forms part of Universal Music Sweden. The company was formed following Universal Music Sweden's full ownership acquisition of Lionheart Music Group. The company consists of several record labels as well as operations in music production and publishing, artist management, and live-entertainment production.

The same trademark is used by an unrelated United States-based Capitol Music Group, also of Universal Music Group, which in turn is based upon, and consists of, the American label Capitol Records. Capitol Records Group Sweden also operates its own "Capitol Records Sweden" label proper.

Background

Founding of Lionheart International
The Lionheart International record label was established in 1990. Lionheart has a dance record label called "Kavalkad" and an electro/dance/pop/rock record label called "SoFo Records". In 2002 they started a collaboration with Mariann Grammofon (Warner Music Group) that resulted in "M&L Records".

Launch of music publishing and involvement with Universal Music Group
In 2002, a music publishing arm, known as Lionheart Music, was set up to primarily serve the signed artists to the group's labels. The publishing business grew quickly that the following year, that an administration agreement was struck with Bonnier Music Publishing for Lionheart Music's song publishing catalogue.

In 2007, Universal Music Group International acquired a majority stake in Lionheart Music Group.

Lionheart Music Group as a single company

In 2011, a three-way merger was formed between the three legal entities of the Lionheart group of companies — record label Lionheart International, music publisher Lionheart Music and artist management and booking company "Molin Ljunggren Productions" MLP — creating Lionheart Music Group.

Full acquisition by Universal Music Group and relaunch
Universal Music Sweden acquired the remaining interest in Lionheart Music Group. In September 2014, Lionheart Music Group was restructured — including being combined with other domestic repertoire operations within Universal Music Sweden — and relaunched as Capitol Music Group Sweden. The umbrella label group includes the Lionheart record label, as well as the Universal Music Group-owned EMI legacy labels Capitol Records and Virgin Records being utilised for domestic repertoire.

Record labels
Capitol Records Sweden
Virgin Records Sweden
Lionheart
Sofo Records
Kavalkad

Music publishing and production 
Lionheart Music

Artist management and live-entertainment
Live

Signed artists
 Lisa Ajax
 Robin Stjernberg
 Polina Gagarina
 The Band Perry
 Tim McGraw
 Dolly Style
 Lena Meyer-Landrut
 Alexander Rybak
 Maria Mittet
 Hera Björk
 Gravitonas
 Timoteij
 Anna Bergendahl
 Brandur Enni
 Sonja Aldén
 Sanna Nielsen
 Shirley Clamp
 Nanne Grönvall
 Jill Johnson
 The Poodles
 Anne-Lie Rydé
 Elisa's
 CajsaStina Åkerström
 Zekes
 Caroline Wennergren
 Rascal Flatts

References

External links
Official website

Swedish record labels
Companies based in Stockholm
Music in Stockholm
Universal Music Group